Taifun 9M15 (typhoon) was a Soviet missile developed to arm the Object 287 tank based on the T-64 tank chassis. The tank was armed with two 73 mm 2A28 low pressure guns mounted either side of a popup missile launcher. Both the guns and the missile launcher were automatically loaded, the guns each being fed from two eight round drums, giving a total of 32 guns rounds and 15 missiles stored in the tank. The missile launch platform was vertically stabilised, allowing the vehicle to move at low speed and still fire. The guns were remotely controlled by the gunner and commander from the front of the hull. 

The Taifun missile had a body diameter of 140 mm. It was fitted with a dual purpose warhead with a HEAT shaped charge capable of penetrating 500 mm of armour, and a fragmentation effect roughly equivalent to a 100 mm HE-FRAG shell. The missile was MCLOS radio command guided from the tank. The missile had an engagement envelope of between 500 and 4000 m. 

Tests were conducted in April 1964, during which the tank performed poorly, and as a result the tank and missile were not accepted for service.

Specifications (Object 287)

 Weight: 36.5 tons
 Length: 6.12 m
 Width: 3.42 m 
 Height: 1.75 m
 Ground clearance 450 mm
 Armor:
 Front hull: 100 - 200 mm 
 Front turret: 330 mm
 Armament:
 140 mm launcher with 15 x 9M15 Taifun missiles 
 2 x 73 mm Smoothbore guns 32 rounds total.
 3000 x 7.62 mm
 Engine: 700 hp diesel
 Road range: 500 km
 ground pressure 0.8 kg/cm 
 Obstacles : 
 Wall: 0.80 m
 Trench: 2.70 m
 Fording: 1.7 m

See also
 IT-1, a Russian missile tank that saw limited service and was developed at around the same time.

External links
 Article about rocket tanks (in Russian)
 Article about the Taifun tank (in Russian)
 Article about the Taifun tank (in Russian)

Anti-tank guided missiles of the Cold War
Cold War missiles of the Soviet Union
History of the tank
Abandoned military projects of the Soviet Union